The Tufts Jumbos are the varsity intercollegiate athletic programs of Tufts University, in Medford, Massachusetts. The Jumbos compete at NCAA Division III level as member of the New England Small College Athletic Conference (NESCAC). Like all Division III schools, Tufts does not offer athletic scholarships. Coed and women's sailing are the only Division I sports at the school.

Tufts won the NACDA Directors' Cup in 2021-22 as the most successful team in NCAA Division III that year.

Sports sponsored

Football

The Tufts football program is one of the oldest in the country. The 1,000th game in team history was played during the 2006 season. Historians point to a Tufts versus Harvard game in 1875 as the first game of college football using American football rules.  The team plays at the Ellis Oval, located on the southwest corner of the campus.

Sailing

The Jumbos particularly stand out in sailing. The team competes in the New England Intercollegiate Sailing Association, and has won the Leonard M. Fowle Trophy eight times. The Jumbos also won the 2001 Dinghy National Championship, and won more championships in the 1990s than any other team. Several world and Olympic champions have been a part of the Tufts Sailing Team; among them is Tomas Hornos (class of 2010), who was world champion in 2007, and Kaitlin Storck, who was awarded the ICSA Women's College Sailor of the Year trophy in 2008. Others include Roger Altreuter in 1975, R. Stuart Johnstone in 1980, Paul Dickey in 1981, and Senet Bischoff in 1996, who all won the ICSA College Sailor of the Year trophy.

Other

Men's Squash maintains a top 20 Division I national ranking. Tufts University won its first NCAA-sanctioned national team championship when the men's lacrosse team defeated Salisbury in the 2010 Division III men's lacrosse final. Since then, Tufts has captured NCAA Division III National Championships in women's field hockey (2012), women's softball (three consecutive from 2013 to 2015), men's lacrosse again (2014, 2015), and men's soccer (2014, 2016, 2018, 2019). Tufts teams also reached the 2008 championship game in women's field hockey and the 2011 championship game in men's lacrosse.

References

External links